Argyropeza is a genus of small deep-sea sea snails, marine gastropod molluscs in the family Procerithiidae.

The name of this genus is derived from the Greek word arguropeza ("silver foot"), the epithet given by Homer to the sea nymph Thetis.

Taxonomy 
The genus Argyropeza is closely related to the genus Bittium, but the shells of species in this genus are thinner and more vitreous, and the suture is more deeply  impressed.

This genus is not well known and its systematic position has long been uncertain. It was sometimes assigned to the Litiopidae Gray, 1847 or to the Cerithiinae within Cerithiidae, both belonging to the same superfamily Cerithioidea.

The genus was moved to Procerithiidae because of its similarity to the fossil genus Crypaulax from the Triassic. This move means that the Argyropeza species are now considered to be living fossils.

According to the Taxonomy of Bouchet & Rocroi (2005) Argyropeza is in the subfamily Cryptaulacinae, within the Procerithiidae.

According to Bandel (2006) Argyropeza is in the newly described subfamily Argyropezinae Bandel, 2006, within the Procerithiidae.

Distribution 
The snails of this deep-sea genus can be found on the continental slopes and island groups in the Indo-Pacific region (Arabian Sea, Australia, Fiji, Indonesia, Japan, Papua, New Guinea, Vanuatu and South Africa). They are detritivores, obtaining their nutrients from detritus and soft sediment.

Description 
They are small snails (6 to 8 mm in length) with a thin, vitreous shell that is elongated and has a pointed spire with a smooth tip. The number of the whorls varies between 9 and 12. The shell is sculptured with low axial ribs. Each whorl is marked by two spiral ribs with sharp nodules. The ovate aperture has a marked siphonal canal and a weak anal canal. The aperture is closed off by a thin, corneous, cerithioid operculum that is multispiral and almost circular. The outer lip is thin. The columella is concave. Their protoconch has 3½ whorls and are sculptured with two spiral lirae.

Until the study of Richard S. Houbrick (1980) almost nothing had been written about the soft parts of these snails. The animal has a long siphon. The cephalic tentacles have the eyes at their base. The taenioglossate radula  has a quadrate rachdian tooth, flanked on each side a trapezoidal lateral tooth and two long marginal teeth. Their larvae are pelagic.

Species 
Species within the genus Aryropeza include:
Argyropeza divina Melvill & Standen, 1901
Argyropeza izekiana Kuroda, 1949
Argyropeza leucocephalum (Watson, 1886)
Argyropeza schepmaniana Melvill, 1912
Argyropeza verecunda  Melvill & Standen, 1903
Synonyms
 Argyropeza cartieri Hornung & Mermod, 1928: synonym of Phosinella cartieri (Hornung & Mermod, 1928)
 Argyropeza doriae Hornung & Mermod, 1926: synonym of Pirenella conica (Blainville, 1829)
 Argyropeza involuta Thiele, 1925: synonym of Varicopeza pauxilla (A. Adams, 1855) (original combination)
 Argyropeza melvilli Schepman, 1909: synonym of Abyssochrysos melvilli (Schepman, 1909) (original combination)
 † Argyropeza suvaensis Ladd, 1977 : synonym of Abyssochrysos melvilli (Schepman, 1909)

References

External link 

Procerithiidae
Extant Pliocene first appearances